Emmett Township may refer to one of the following places in the United States:

 Emmet Township, McDonough County, Illinois
 Emmet Township, Emmet County, Iowa
 Emmet Township, Renville County, Minnesota
 Emmet Township, Holt County, Nebraska
 Emmet Township, Union County, South Dakota

See also
 Emmett Township (disambiguation)

Township name disambiguation pages